This is a list of years in Botswana.

20th century

21st century

 
Botswana history-related lists
Botswana